The Halychyna Oil Refinery Complex (formerly Drohobych Oil Refinery) is the oldest oil refinery in Ukraine, and it was built in 1863. As of 2005, its capacity is about 3.5 million tons of crude oil per year. The refinery is located in the city of Drohobych, Lviv Oblast.

Awards
Order of the Red Banner of Labour

References

See also
 Privat Group
 Petro Dyminskyi
 Ihor Kolomoyskyi

Companies established in 1863
Companies of Ukraine by city
Economy of Lviv Oblast
Economy of Ukraine by city
Drohobych
1863 in Ukraine
History of Lviv Oblast
Oil refineries in Ukraine
Privat Group
Companies based in Lviv Oblast